The Gebelein predynastic mummies are six naturally mummified bodies, dating to approximately 3400 BC from the Late Predynastic period of Ancient Egypt. They were the first complete predynastic bodies to be discovered. The well-preserved bodies were excavated at the end of the nineteenth century by Wallis Budge, the British Museum Keeper for Egyptology, from shallow sand graves near Gebelein (today, Naga el-Gherira) in the Egyptian desert.

Budge excavated all the bodies from the same grave site. Two were identified as male and one as female, with the others being of undetermined sex. The bodies were given to the British Museum in 1900. Some grave-goods were documented at the time of excavation as "pots and flints", however they were not passed on to the British Museum and their whereabouts remain unknown. Three of the bodies were found with coverings of different types (reed matting, palm fibre and an animal skin), which still remain with the bodies. The bodies were found in foetal positions lying on their left sides.

Since 1901, the first body excavated (EA 32751) has remained on display in the British Museum. This body was originally nicknamed Ginger due to his red hair; this nickname is no longer officially used as part of recent ethical policies for human remains.

Excavation

In 1895 and 1896 the ruins at Abydos, Tukh, Hierakonpolis and Gebelein were excavated. In 1892 Jacques de Morgan, Director of Antiquities in Egypt, proved that pottery found at Abydos and Nakadah pre-dated the dynastic period, stimulating interest by many European archaeologists. As each excavation was completed, local Egyptian residents would continue to search the sites for remains. In 1895 E. A. Wallis Budge, on behalf of the British Museum, procured inscribed coffins and funerary furniture from the 12th Dynasty tombs at Al-Barshah by working with the Egyptian Service of Antiquities. Budge started purchasing predynastic finds from the locals including bowls, spear and arrow heads, carved flint and bone figures and partial human remains (described as chiefly bones without skin or flesh remaining).

In 1896, Budge was approached by a resident of Gebelein who claimed to have found more mummies. Budge was taken to the bodies, and he immediately recognized them as from the predynastic period and the first complete pre-dynastic bodies identified. He began excavations and a total of six mummified bodies were removed from shallow sand graves at Baḥr Bila Mâ (Waterless River) located at the eastern slopes of the north-most hill at Gebelein.

The only grave goods were a pot found with the female adult body and partial remains of wicker, fur and linen with the other bodies. In the predynastic period bodies were usually buried naked and sometimes loosely wrapped. In such a burial, when the body is covered in warm sand, the environmental conditions mean that most of the water in the body is quickly evaporated or drained away, meaning that the corpse is naturally dried and preserved. This method was widely used in the pre-dynastic Egyptian period, before artificial mummification was developed. The natural mummification that occurred with these dry sand burials may have led to the original Egyptian belief in an after-death survival and started the tradition of leaving food and implements for an afterlife.

All bodies were in similar flexed positions lying on their left sides with knees raised up towards their chin. In comparison, most bodies excavated from Egypt dating to the predynastic period are in a similar position, however at Merimda Beni Salama and El-Amra bodies were found on their right sides. From the time these bodies were buried up until the Middle Kingdom period, the dead were laid on their sides. After this period they were buried on their backs (dorsal position), and from the Fifth Dynasty the bodies were always fully extended.

Archaeological interest in Gebelein started in the early 18th century and was included in Benoît de Maillet's Description de l'Egypte. The site includes the remains from a temple to the deity Hathor with a number of cartouches on mud bricks and a royal stela from the 2nd Dynasty and 3rd Dynasty. Later period finds include 400 Demotic and Greek ostraca from a 2nd–1st century BC mercenary garrison. As well as official excavations, many artefacts from the site were traded on the antiquities market and can be found in the museums of Turin, Cairo, Berlin, Lyons and the British Museum.

Description
The bodies were buried in separate shallow graves, placed in the fetal position (knees raised towards their heads), which was the most common form for Egyptian burials of the time.

In 1967, a series of X-rays and photographs of all mummified bodies in the British Museum's Egyptian Antiquities collection provided a detailed analysis for the mummies from the Gebelein excavations.  The findings are summarized below:

The first body excavated had red hair; this led to the nickname of "Ginger" by curators and later by the public. After the Human Tissue Act 2004, the British Museum has developed policies for ethical treatment of human remains, and no longer uses this nickname.

Death of Gebelein Man
In November 2012 it was revealed that EA 32751 (Gebelein Man) had probably been murdered. A CAT scan of the mummified body taken at the Cromwell Hospital in London showed that Gebelein Man was aged about 18 to 20 at the time of his death and was well-muscled. Under his left shoulder blade, the scan revealed a puncture to the body; the murder weapon was used with such force that it slightly damaged the shoulder blade, but shattered the rib beneath it and penetrated the lung. It was believed that the injury was caused by a copper blade or flint knife at least 12 cm in length and 2 cm wide. Daniel Antoine, the British Museum's expert on human remains, believes that Gebelein Man had been taken by surprise by the attack as there were no defence wounds.

Exhibition history

The mummies were acquired by the British Museum in 1900. One male adult body, museum number EA 32751 (then nicknamed "Ginger"), went on display in 1901, and was the earliest mummified body seen by the public. Apart from maintenance, it has been on continuous display in the same gallery since 1901. In 1987 the body was temporarily taken off display for restoration and a female mummified body replaced it. She was nicknamed "Gingerella" even though the body has long brown hair.

The male body, EA 32751, is displayed in a reconstructed sand grave in the British Museum in room 64 and case 15. Though Budge wrote of "pots and flints" with the body, these artefacts were not acquired by the museum. A number of Egyptian grave goods taken from similar graves of the period are instead used in the display. The grave goods include black-topped clay pots that were typical of the predynastic period through to Naqada II, and plain and buff coloured pots and bowls typical of slightly later periods. There are also slate palettes, hard stone vessels and flint knives which would be associated with more elaborate burials of the historical period.

Of the other five bodies, only the female adult, given museum number EA 32752, has been exhibited.  In 1997-8 the body was part of a tour to Rome as part of the Palazzo Ruspoli, Ancient Faces exhibition.  Again in 2001 the body went to Birmingham as part of the Gas Hall Egypt Revealed exhibition. In 2001, before going out on loan, the body had some restoration using Japanese kozo paper to secure a loose finger, reattach a rib and reattach some locks of hair. Strips of polyethylene were used to reduce movement of the right arm.

See also
List of unsolved murders
Ötzi the Iceman, a rough contemporary.

Footnotes

Sources
 
 
 
 
 

4th millennium BC in Egypt
1896 archaeological discoveries
Anthropology
Ancient Egyptian mummies
Ancient Egyptian objects in the British Museum
Unsolved murders in Egypt